Astell & Kern is a South Korean consumer electronics company founded in October 2013, and is wholly owned by Dreamus. The company manufactures media players, CD players, headphones, and home cinema products. It was launched as a premium successor to iriver products.

History

Roots and founding 
In January 2013, iriver debuted the AK100 media player at CES 2013, to polarizing critical reception from critics at release.<ref>{{Cite web|url=http://www.digitaltrends.com/home-theater/irivers-astell-and-kern-ak100-what-does-a-700-ipod-sound-like/|title=What does a $700 iPod' sound like? Our first listen with iriver's Astell & Kern AK100|last=Waniata|first=Ryan|date=10 January 2013|publisher=Digital Trends|access-date=29 August 2016}}</ref> In July, a pair of in-ear monitors dubbed the AKR01 were released to complement the media players. In August, the AK100's successor, the AK120, was released with minor design enhancements but notoriously the addition of two Wolfson WM8740 DAC chipsets, and was released to better reception. In October, Astell & Kern was founded by iRiver to develop the in-brand products. A limited edition called the AK120 Titan was released shortly in December.

 Growth, icons and debuts 
On 9 January 2014, the company debuted the AK240 for CES 2014, with it debuting Wi-FI connectivity, and an operating system based upon Android instead of Linux directly. Following the acquisition of Wolfson by Cirrus Logic, the company replaced the Wolfson DAC duo with Logic 4398 chipsets. At CES, the AKR02, the successor to the AKR01, debuted in February; Astell & Kern also revealed Home cinema products, such as a valve amplifier and cylindrical speaker, as well. In May, collaborating with Jerry Harvey Audio, the company released the AKR03 monitors, successing the AKR02, as well as the AK120II and AK100II players, the second-generation of the AK120 and AK100 players respectively. In honor of the 75th anniversary of Blue Note Records, the AK240 announced a "Blue Note Special Limited Edition" on 17 October.

In January 2015, the "AK T5p" headphones, which were co-produced with Beyerdynamic, were released. In February, the company debuted the stainless steel model of the AK240, the AK240SS, and the AK500N, a Network Audio System which can store 1TB of files in a solid-state drive, can stream lossless from PCs and NAS devices, and is noiseless when plugged in. In April, the AK Jr. was released. Unlike other models, Jr. is an entry-level and much smaller media player than other models.

 Expansion and product debuts 
In August, the all-in-one system AK T1 was released, along with the Super Junior x AK Jr collaboration and the Beyerdynamic-produced AK T8iE monitors. In November, Hyundai Card collaborated with Astell & Kern to create the AK100II x HCC model, as well as the AK320's debut and Beyerdynamic-produced AK T1p. In 2015, Astell & Kern collaborated with Japanese voice actress Kana Hanazawa to create the limited AK100II Kana Hanazawa edition, which would include a special song titled "Tadoritsuku Basho" (A Place to Reach) pre-installed in the player.

On 21 January 2016, the company released a Copper Edition of the AK380. In February, the company released four sets of monitors co-produced with Jerry Harvey Audio: Layla II, Roxanne II, Angie II, and Rosie. In July, the company developed a new media player: the AK70.

 Products 
 Mastering Quality Sound (MQS) 

Astell & Kern markets 24-bit audio with a 44.1 kHz to 192 kHz sampling rate under the name Mastering Quality Sound (MQS)''. Music sold with this tag comes in both the lossless formats: WAV, AIFF, FLAC, ALAC, APE as well as lossy formats: MP3, AAC, WMA and OGG.

Hardware

References 

Audio equipment manufacturers of South Korea
Consumer electronics brands
Headphones manufacturers
South Korean brands
IRiver